Universidad Nacional Micaela Bastidas de Apurímac is a university in Abancay, Peru.

External links
Official site

Universities in Peru